Óscar Soto Carrillo (born 9 June 1983 in Mexico City) is a two-time Olympic modern pentathlete from Mexico. He also won silver medal at the 2002 Junior World Championships in Sydney, Australia, also individual and team gold medals at the 2006 and 2010 Central American and Caribbean Games in Cartagena, Colombia, and Mayagüez, Puerto Rico, and at the 2011 Pan American Games in his home nation, Guadalajara, Mexico.

Soto achieved his best results, and performed consistently in each of the five sporting disciplines for the men's event at the Olympics, when he finished eighth in 2008, and fourteenth in 2012.

References

External links
  (archived page from Pentathlon.org)
 

Living people
1983 births
Mexican male modern pentathletes
Modern pentathletes at the 2008 Summer Olympics
Modern pentathletes at the 2012 Summer Olympics
Olympic modern pentathletes of Mexico
Modern pentathletes at the 2011 Pan American Games
Pan American Games gold medalists for Mexico
Sportspeople from Mexico City
Pan American Games medalists in modern pentathlon
Central American and Caribbean Games gold medalists for Mexico
Central American and Caribbean Games silver medalists for Mexico
Competitors at the 2006 Central American and Caribbean Games
Competitors at the 2010 Central American and Caribbean Games
Central American and Caribbean Games medalists in modern pentathlon
Medalists at the 2011 Pan American Games
21st-century Mexican people